Magazine were an English rock band formed in 1977 in Manchester in England by singer Howard Devoto and guitarist John McGeoch. After leaving the punk group Buzzcocks in early 1977, Devoto decided to create a more progressive and less "traditional" rock band. The original lineup of Magazine was composed of Devoto, McGeoch, Barry Adamson on bass, Bob Dickinson on keyboards and Martin Jackson on drums.

Their debut album Real Life (1978) was critically acclaimed and was one of the first post-punk albums. After releasing two other albums, Secondhand Daylight and The Correct Use of Soap, McGeoch left the band in 1980 to join Siouxsie and the Banshees. Magazine released another studio album and disbanded in 1981.

They reunited in 2009 for a UK tour with Noko on guitar. Magazine released an album of new material, No Thyself, in October 2011, followed by a short UK tour.

Magazine and their original guitarist McGeoch have been cited as an influence by bands and musicians such as the Smiths, Radiohead and John Frusciante.

History 
Devoto formed Magazine in Manchester, shortly after he left Buzzcocks in early 1977. In April 1977, he met guitarist McGeoch, then an art student, and they began writing songs, some of which would appear on the first Magazine album. They then recruited Barry Adamson on bass, Bob Dickinson on keyboards and Martin Jackson (previously of the Freshies) on drums, forming the first lineup of the band. After signing to Virgin Records, Magazine played their debut live gig at Rafters in Manchester on 28 October 1977.

"Motorcade" co-writer Dickinson, whose background was in classical and avant-garde music, left shortly after several gigs in late 1977. In early 1978, the band released their first single, "Shot by Both Sides", a song Magazine recorded as a quartet. It featured a guitar-bass-drums sound similar to punk rock. Shortly after the single's release, Dave Formula, who had played with a briefly successful 1960s rock band from Manchester called St. Louis Union, joined as keyboardist. "Shot by Both Sides" used a chord progression suggested by Pete Shelley, which was also used in the Buzzcocks track "Lipstick". The Magazine single just missed the UK top 40. The band, with Formula on keyboards, made its first major TV appearance on Top of the Pops in February 1978, performing the single.

Following a British tour to promote their debut album Real Life (which made the UK top 30), Jackson left Magazine in late July. He was replaced briefly by Paul Spencer, who performed with the band for gigs across Europe and some television appearances, including The Old Grey Whistle Test, where they played "Definitive Gaze". Spencer quit partway through the tour, joining the Speedometors shortly afterwards. He was replaced in October by John Doyle, who completed the Real Life promotional tour and remained in the band.

Magazine's second album, Secondhand Daylight, was released in 1979, reaching the UK top 40. The album featured a greater use of synthesisers. That same year, McGeoch, Adamson and Formula joined electronic project Visage, recording and releasing the single "Tar".

After the release of Secondhand Daylight, Devoto decided to change producers. He chose Martin Hannett, who produced their next album, The Correct Use of Soap, released the following year and again making the top 30. Following its release, McGeoch decided to leave the band, tired of Magazine's low sales and their less guitar-oriented songs. He soon joined Siouxsie and the Banshees. To replace him, the band hired Robin Simon, who had been in Ultravox and Neo. That lineup toured across Europe and Australia, recording their next release, the live album Play. Simon made some initial recordings and rehearsals for what would be the next Magazine album, including co-writing the song "So Lucky", but he left the band before the album was released so that he could record the John Foxx solo album The Garden.

Again without a guitarist, Devoto called in his former college friend at Bolton, Ben Mandelson (a former Amazorblades member). This lineup completed the 1981 recording of the band's fourth studio album, Magic, Murder and the Weather, but Devoto quit that May, months before its release, and the remaining members decided to disband. A year later, After the Fact, the first Magazine compilation, was released.

Adamson continued collaborating with Visage, and also began to work with Shelley, the Birthday Party and Nick Cave and the Bad Seeds. Jackson later played with the Chameleons, Swing Out Sister and the Durutti Column. Formula continued as a member of Visage and joined Ludus; and Mandelson joined the Mekons. Doyle joined the Armoury Show in Scotland in 1983, which also featured McGeoch; the latter later played guitar for Public Image Ltd. After a brief solo outing and two albums with Luxuria, Devoto quit music to become a photo archivist, until a new collaboration with Shelley produced the Buzzkunst album in 2002. McGeoch died in 2004, aged 48.

Reunion 
In July 2008, Devoto and Magazine confirmed that they would reform for five dates in February 2009. The lineup included Devoto, Formula, Adamson and Doyle. The Radiohead guitarist Jonny Greenwood, a Magazine fan, declined an offer to fill in for McGeoch. According to the Radiohead collaborator Adam Buxton, Jonny was "overwhelmed" and too shy to accept the role. Noko, Devoto's bandmate in Luxuria, was the guitarist on the tour.

The sold-out shows received critical acclaim. The group went on to play at festivals in the UK and abroad that summer, before performing "The Soap Show" in Manchester, Edinburgh and London. At these concerts, the band played two sets: a performance of The Correct Use of Soap in full, followed by a set composed of other songs from their catalogue.

In January 2010, Noko officially joined the band, becoming a full member of Magazine. The band started work on new material. In November 2010, Adamson left to concentrate on his film work and solo recordings. Jon "Stan" White joined as bass player on the new recordings and debuted live on 30 June 2011 at Wolverhampton Slade Rooms, where Magazine were playing a warm-up show for their Hop Farm Festival appearance two days later.

A new studio album, No Thyself, was released worldwide by Wire Sound on 24 October 2011, and the band embarked on a UK tour in November. On 16 April 2016, as part of Record Store Day, the band released Once at the Academy, a live 5-track 12" EP recorded at their reunion shows at Manchester Academy in February 2009.

Legacy
Magazine have been cited as influential by many bands and musicians.

Radiohead guitarist Jonny Greenwood named McGeoch his biggest guitar influence, and said that Magazine's songwriting "informs so much of what we do". Radiohead performed a cover of "Shot By Both Sides" in 2000. Johnny Marr of the Smiths cited Magazine as an influence, particularly McGeoch's guitar work. Morrissey covered "A Song from Under the Floorboards" as a B-side to his 2006 single "The Youngest Was the Most Loved". "Floorboards" was also covered by My Friend the Chocolate Cake on their 1994 album Brood. MGMT played a version of "Burst" on tour in 2011.

Lolita Pop recorded a cover of "A Song from under the Floorboards" on 1989's Love Poison. Half Man Half Biscuit have performed live covers of a number of Magazine songs. "The Light Pours Out of Me" was covered by several acts including Peter Murphy, Ministry, the Mission, Sleep Chamber and Zero Boys. The band No Fun at All did a cover of "Shot by Both Sides" on their record And Now for Something Completely Different. Mansun covered "Shot by Both Sides" for John Peel sessions. Duff McKagan cited Real Life as an influence, particularly on tracks where a chorus effect is used.

In April 2022, a biography of McGeoch, his life and his legacy was released on Omnibus Press. The Light Pours Out of Me: The Authorised Biography of John McGeoch features recent interviews of guitarists and acts who admire McGeoch's work: the author of the biography met Jonny Greenwood, Johnny Marr, John Frusciante and many other musicians, relatives and friends, including Siouxsie Sioux and Devoto.

Members 
Howard Devoto - lead vocals (1977–1981, 2009–2011)
John McGeoch - guitar (1977–1980)
Barry Adamson - bass guitar (1977–1981, 2009–2010)
Martin Jackson - drums (1977–1978)
Bob Dickinson - keyboards (1977)
John Scott - guitar (1977)
Dave Formula - keyboards (1977–1981, 2009–2011)
Paul Spencer - drums (1978)
John Doyle - drums (1978–1981, 2009–2011)
Robin Simon - guitar (1980)
Ben Mandelson - guitar (1981)
Noko - guitar (2009–2011)
Jonathan "Stan" White - bass guitar (2010–2011)

Timeline

Discography 

The Magazine discography consists of five studio albums, four live albums, seven compilation albums, two video albums, one extended play and 10 singles.

All titles were released by Virgin Records; except where indicated.

Studio albums

Live albums

Singles

Compilation albums

Video albums

Further reading

See also 
 List of new wave artists and bands
 List of Peel sessions
 List of post-punk bands
 Music of the United Kingdom (1970s)

References

External links 

 

English new wave musical groups
Musical groups from Manchester
English post-punk music groups
Musical groups established in 1977
Musical groups disestablished in 1981
Musical groups reestablished in 2009
Musical groups disestablished in 2011